The Cape elephantfish, josef, or St Joseph shark (Callorhinchus capensis) is a species of fish in the family Callorhinchidae.

Description
The Cape elephantfish is a smooth silvery or bronze fish  which grows to 120 cm in total length, with a digging proboscis on the front of its snout. The first dorsal fin has a large venomous spine in front of it. There are darker markings on the flanks and head. At maturity, the males have a pair of calcified claspers, paired retractable prepelvic graspers, and a door-knocker-like projection (tentaculum) on their heads.

Distribution
It is found off the coasts of Namibia and South Africa inshore and down to 374 m.

Ecology
The Cape elephantfish eats sea urchins, bivalves, crustaceans, gastropods, worms, and bony fish. Its predators include seals and sharks.

It is oviparous, laying two egg cases at a time. The egg case is large (about 25 cm) and spindle-shaped, with a ragged frill all around it. Females mature at 50 cm, males at 44 cm. Mating and egg laying occurs inshore.

References

Callorhinchus
Fish described in 1865
Taxa named by Auguste Duméril
Taxonomy articles created by Polbot